Cristina Beer (born 22 November 1980) is a Brazilian water polo player.

She played with the Brazil women's national water polo team at the  2011 World Aquatics Championships.

References

External links 
 
 
 
 

1980 births
Living people
Brazilian female water polo players
Pan American Games medalists in water polo
Pan American Games bronze medalists for Brazil
Water polo players at the 2011 Pan American Games
Medalists at the 2011 Pan American Games
Water polo players from São Paulo
20th-century Brazilian women
21st-century Brazilian women